Reach Me is a 2014 American drama film directed and written by John Herzfeld. The film stars Sylvester Stallone, Kyra Sedgwick, Terry Crews, Thomas Jane, Kevin Connolly, Lauren Cohan, Kelsey Grammer, and Tom Berenger.
The film was produced by Rebekah Chaney, Cassian Elwes, Buddy Patrick, John Herzfeld.

The plot revolves around how a self-help book inspires a diverse group of people: a journalist and his editor, a former inmate, a hip-hop mogul, an actor and an undercover cop.  The creation of Reach Me was influenced as least partly by Herzfeld's memories of seeing televangelist Reverend Ike and reading  Napoleon Hill's self-help book, Think and Grow Rich, although Herzfeld says the film is "not about getting rich, but believing in yourself."

Cast
 Sylvester Stallone as Gerald
 Kyra Sedgwick as Collette
 Thomas Jane as Wolfie
 Lauren Cohan as Kate
 Kelsey Grammer as Angelo AldoBrandini
 Kevin Connolly as Roger King 
 Tom Berenger as Teddy
 Nelly as E-Ruption
 Omari Hardwick as Dominic
 Terry Crews as Wilson
 Danny Trejo as Vic
 Danny Aiello as Father Paul
 Ryan Kwanten as Jack Burns
 David O'Hara as Thumper
 Elizabeth Henstridge as Eve
 Rebekah Chaney as Denise-Denise
 Chuck Zito as Joe
 Tom Sizemore as Frank
 Cary Elwes as Kersey

Production
To build a solid cast for the movie, Herzfeld started with Stallone; the two had been friends since they were roommates together as students at University of Miami. After Stallone committed to participate, other actors agreed to join the cast at minimum pay rates.  Herzfeld recruited another long-time friend, Danny Aiello, to play the role of a mobster – but after Aiello declined that role, Herzfeld and Aiello collaborated on creating the character of Father Paul.  Aiello credits his work on Reach Me with aiding his emotional recovery from the death of his son, Danny Aiello III.

While inviting friends' participation in Reach Me, Herzfeld also enlisted close relatives of participants:  Herzfeld's wife, Rebekah Chaney, joined as co-producer and cast member.  Stallone's youngest daughter, Scarlet, had her acting debut in Reach Me, although she described the experience as "pretty humiliating" because she "just had to say one tiny line, and they had to cut that in half."

Despite reaching the  goal on Kickstarter, the production team decided to withdraw its Kickstarter campaign and start again with the competing crowdfunding platform Indiegogo, citing its broader and more flexible capabilities.

Marketing
The first official trailer for John Herzfeld's Reach Me was released on July 7, 2014, and the second official trailer was released on September 25, 2014.

Reception
The film holds a 4% approval rating on Rotten Tomatoes based on 24 reviews, with an average rating of 3.2/10. The website's critics consensus reads: "Featuring a bewildering array of talented actors pummeled by disjointed direction and a dull, hackneyed script, Reach Me is so fundamentally misbegotten that its title reads more like a threat." At Metacritic, which assigns a weighted average score out of 100 to reviews from mainstream critics, the film received an average score of 21% based on 14 reviews.

See also
 Grand Canyon
 Magnolia
 Third Person
 Crash

References

External links
 
 
 

2014 drama films
American drama films
American independent films
Films directed by John Herzfeld
Films shot in Los Angeles
Indiegogo projects
Crowdfunded films
2014 independent films
2010s English-language films
2010s American films